Thomas Eyton may refer to:
 Thomas Eyton (politician)
 Thomas Eyton (public servant)
 Thomas Campbell Eyton, English naturalist